James Wheeler Woodford Birch, commonly known as J. W. W. Birch (3 April 1826 – 2 November 1875) was a British colonial official who was assassinated in the Malay state of Perak in 1875, an event that led to the outbreak of the Perak War and ultimately to the extension of British political influence over the Malay Peninsula.

Background
Born in 1826, Birch served for a short period in the Royal Navy before joining the Roads Department in Ceylon in 1846. His career in Ceylon was successful, and on 6 June 1870 he was transferred to Singapore to take up the position of Colonial Secretary.

Following the Pangkor Engagement, under which the Raja Abdullah had agreed to accept a British political agent to be known as a "Resident" at his court, Birch was appointed to the post on 4 November 1874 as the government custodian to the Sultan of Perak.

Assassination 
A Malay deputation entreated with Governor-General Andrew Clarke in Singapore "to prevent the Resident from interfering with religion and custom, from acting without consulting Sultan and chiefs, and from depriving them of their property, namely fugitive slaves and feudal dues." Clarke had already observed on 25 March 1875 that, "I am very much annoyed with Birch and the heads-over-heels way in which he does things; he and I will come to sorrow yet, if he does not mind." Due to unfavourable responses, on 21 July 1875 Raja Abdullah called a meeting of chiefs where after discussing poisoning Birch, they accepted the Maharaja Lela's offer to stab Birch to death.

Birch was killed on 2 November 1875 by followers of a local Malay chief, Maharaja Lela, including Sepuntum, who speared him to death while he was in the bath-house of his boat, SS Dragon, moored on the Perak river-bank below the Maharaja Lela's house, in Pasir Salak, near today's Teluk Intan (Teluk Anson).

While experienced in the affairs of colonial government, he was never comfortable speaking in Malay, he also aroused the hostility of several Perak chiefs due to the new taxation collection system and his enforcement of public humiliation to enforce his authority such as burning homes and ordering the force surrender of arms and slaves.

Sultan Abdullah, who was also believed to have some complicity in the assassination, was deposed and exiled to the Seychelles. His arch-rival Raja Yusuf was installed as sultan in his place.

In the aftermath of the event, the administration shifted to Taiping. A new Resident, Sir Hugh Low, was appointed and went about his administration of Perak in a more diplomatic way. Whilst still banning outright slavery, he gradually phased out debt-slavery and assuaged the feelings of the ruler and chieftains by allowing for adequate monthly compensation to them.

Historical interpretations of Birch's assassination 
Malaysian historian Cheah Boon Kheng argues that while "in present-day Malaysian school history textbooks," Birch's assassination "is presented as an anti-colonial uprising, in which almost all the Perak Malays participated", in fact the political situation in Perak was more complex, with deep divisions between supporters of the two rival claimants to the throne of Perak, Raja Abdullah and Raja Ismail. Cheah argues that Maharaja Lela's actions in contributing to Birch's death must be understood in the context of Malay feudal rivalries and not as an early example of resistance to imperialism.

Memorial
Birch's grave is located near the site of British fort at Kampung Memali, about 24 km from Pasir Salak. His grave is now covered by a palm oil estate. The Birch Memorial Clock Tower was built in 1909 and still stands in front of the Ipoh State Mosque. One of the 44 figures on the clock, an image of the Prophet Muhammad, was painted over in the 1990s due to religious sensitivities. Roads in Kuala Lumpur and Taiping were thought to have been named after him (Birch Road), but this was for a different Birch (namely, his eldest son Ernest Woodford Birch, also a Resident of Perak). The same road was renamed Maharajalela Road after Malaysia's independence in 1957. Similarly, there are Birch Roads in several towns in Malaysia (Seremban, Penang and Ipoh) and in Singapore.

Drama and film
Malaysian dramatist Kee Thuan Chye's 1994 book We Could **** You, Mr Birch is a dramatic reinterpretation of the events around the Birch assassination.

There have been several unsuccessful attempts to make a film based on the Birch assassination. The late Malaysian actor, director and politician Jins Shamsuddin, who was from Perak, announced plans in 2004 to make a film entitled The King of the River: Pasir Salak, which was to have been an epic production involving 1,500 extras. However, the film was never completed: Jins Shamsuddin commented in 2009 that making a film about Birch was a lifelong dream, saying, "I hope to complete my movie on the historical events that happened in Pasir Salak before I die." Malaysian director Mamat Khalid, who was also from Perak, commented in December 2016 that after 18 years of preparation, his film about Birch, Pasir Salak Pasir Berdarah (The Sand of Pasir Salak is the Sand of Blood) would soon enter production. At the time of Mamat Khalid's death in 2021, the film was unfinished but the National Film Development Corporation Malaysia announced that it would support the completion of the film.

See also
Corresp: Actions of Perak Expeditionary Force post-murder of Birch

References

External links
Death on the Perak River – The assassination of J W W Birch*
WorldStatesmen – Malaysia
Education Malaysia – Rewriting our history
History of Malaysia, a tale of Tussels, Tin and Tolerance

1826 births
1875 deaths
History of Perak
Administrators in British Malaya
Assassinated British people
British people murdered abroad
People murdered in Malaysia
Assassinated Malaysian politicians
Chief Secretaries of Singapore
Administrators in British Singapore
1875 murders in Asia